Paul David Nassau (January 30, 1930 in New York City – March 9, 2013 in Palm Beach Gardens) was an American composer and lyricist for the stage. He contributed songs to the musical revue New Faces of 1956, and wrote both the music and lyric to the Broadway shows Happy Town (1959), A Joyful Noise (1966), and The Education of H*Y*M*A*N K*A*P*L*A*N (1968). He married Chloe Anderson on December 23, 1953. The couple had two children, Robert and Julie.

References

External links

The Berkshire Eagle: Paul Nassau obituary

1930 births
2013 deaths
American musical theatre composers
American musical theatre lyricists